Smoke Hole may refer to:
 Smoke hole, a hole in a roof for the smoke from a fire to vent
 Smoke Hole Canyon, or Smoke Hole, a gorge in the Allegheny Mountains of West Virginia, U.S.
 Smoke Hole, West Virginia, a former unincorporated community
 Smoke Hole Caverns, a picturesque show cave

See also
 Smokey Hole Cave, in Manchester, Jamaica